Nicander of Colophon (fl. 2nd century BC), Greek poet, physician and grammarian, was born at Claros (Ahmetbeyli in modern Turkey), near Colophon, where his family held the hereditary priesthood of Apollo. He flourished under Attalus III of Pergamum.

He wrote a number of works both in prose and verse, of which two survive complete. The longest, Theriaca, is a hexameter poem (958 lines) on the nature of venomous animals and the wounds which they inflict. The other, Alexipharmaca, consists of 630 hexameters treating of poisons and their antidotes. Nicander's main source for medical information was the physician Apollodorus of Egypt. Among his lost works, Heteroeumena was a mythological epic, used by Ovid in the Metamorphoses and epitomized by Antoninus Liberalis; Georgica, of which considerable fragments survive, was perhaps imitated by Virgil.

The works of Nicander were praised by Cicero (De oratore, i. 16), imitated by Ovid and Lucan, and frequently quoted by Pliny and other writers (e.g. Tertullian in De Scorpiace, I, 1).

List of works

Surviving poems 
 Theriaca (Of Venomous Animals)
 Alexipharmaca
 Epigrams

Lost poems 
 Cimmerii
 Europia
 Georgica ("Farming")
 Heteroeumena ("Metamorphoses")
 Hyacinthus
 Hymnus ad Attalum ("Hymn to Attalus")
 Melissourgica ("Beekeeping")
 Oetaica
 Ophiaca
 Sicelia
 Thebaica

Lost prose works 
 Aetolica ("History of Aetolia")
 Colophoniaca ("History of Colophon")
 De Poetis Colophoniis ("On poets from Colophon")
 Glossae ("Difficult words")

Notes

References

Bibliography 
 Nicander ed. and tr. A. S. F. Gow, A. F. Scholfield. Cambridge: Cambridge University Press, 1953.
 Earlier editions by JG Schneider (1792, 1816); O. Schneider (1856) (with the Scholia).
 The Scholia (from the Göttingen manuscript) were edited by 
 H. Klauser, "De Dicendi Genere Nicandri" (Dissertationes Philologicae Vindobonenses, vi. 1898).

 W. Vollgraff, Nikander und Ovid (Groningen, 1909 ff.).

External links 

 An ancient Life of Nicander, from the scholia
 Theriaca et Alexipharmaca recensuit et emendavit, fragmenta collegit, commentationes addidit Otto Schneider. Accedunt scholia in Theriaca ex recensione Henrici Keil., scholia in Alexipharmaca ex recognitione Bussemakeri et R. Bentlei emedationes, Lipsiae sumptibus et typis B. G. Teubneri, 1856.
Poetae bucolici et didactici. Theocritus, Bion, Moschus, Nicander, Oppianus, Marcellus de piscibus, poeta de herbis, C. Fr. Ameis, F. S. Lehrs (ed.), Parisiis, editore Ambrosio Firmin Didot, 1862, pp. 127-163.
 English translations of Theriaca and Alexipharmaca.

Scholia
 

2nd-century BC Greek physicians
2nd-century BC poets
2nd-century BC historians
Ancient Greek epic poets
Ancient Colophonians
Ancient Greek grammarians
Ancient Greek priests
Hellenistic-era historians
Hellenistic poets
Historians from Hellenistic Anatolia
Epigrammatists of the Greek Anthology
Kingdom of Pergamon